Complexity theory may refer to:

Science and technology
 Computational complexity theory, a field in theoretical computer science and mathematics
 Complex systems theory, the study of the complexity in context of complex systems
 Assembly theory, a way of characterizing extraterrestrial molecular complexity to assess the probability of the presence of life

Other uses
 Complexity economics, the application of complexity theory to economics
 Complexity theory and organizations, the application of complexity theory to strategy

See also
 Computational complexity
 Complexity (disambiguation)
 Systems theory
 Complex adaptive system, a special case of complex systems
 Complex network